Cúpira is a city in the state of Miranda, Venezuela. It is the capital of Pedro Gual  Municipality. Its name may derive from an indigenous word pira, referring to a variety of Amaranth.

Cities in Miranda (state)